The Maritime Artillery Militia (Italian: Milizia marittima di artiglieria or MILMART) was an artillery unit of Italy's Milizia Volontaria per la Sicurezza Nazionale. It was active from 1939 to 6 December 1943.

History
With the demobilisation of the Regio Esercito's coastal artillery units in 1934, responsibility for this had been transferred to the Regia Marina.

Composition and organisation

MILMART batteries

Order of battle

The Mobile MILMART section of the Reggimento "San Marco"

References

Bibliography (in Italian)
 V. Ilari e A. Sema, Marte in orbace, Casa Editrice Nuove Ricerche, Ancona, 1988.
 E. Lucas e G. De Vecchi, Storia delle unità combattenti della M.V.S.N. (1923-1943), Ed. Volpe, Roma, 1976.
 L. Fulvi, Le Fanterie di Marina Italiane, Ufficio Storico della Marina Militare.
 G. Balestra e A. Curami, Gli autocannoni della Regia Marina nella campagna in Africa Settentrionale, Bollettino d'Archivio dell'Ufficio Storico della Marina Militare, dicembre 1991.
 C.A. Clerici, Le difese costiere italiane nelle due guerre mondiali, Albertelli Edizioni Speciali, Parma, 1996.

External links (in Italian)
 
 

Blackshirts